Regina Maršíková and Pam Teeguarden were the defending champions but competed this year with different partners. Maršíková teamed up with Helena Anliot, and lost in the semifinals to Lesley Bowrey and Gail Benedetti. Teeguarden teamed up with Marjorie Blackwood, and lost in the second round to Daniela Marzano and Paula Smith.

Mima Jaušovec and Virginia Ruzici won in the final 5–7, 6–4, 8–6 against Lesley Bowrey and Gail Benedetti.

Draw

Finals

Top half

Bottom half

References

External links
1978 French Open – Women's draws and results at the International Tennis Federation

Women's Doubles
French Open by year – Women's doubles
1978 in women's tennis
1978 in French women's sport